Chris Pritt (born November 17, 1978) is an American politician serving as a member of the West Virginia House of Delegates from the 36th district. Elected in November 2020, he assumed office on December 1, 2020.

Early life and education 
Pritt was born in Stuart, Virginia. He earned a Bachelor of Arts degree in English from West Virginia Wesleyan College, a Master of Public Administration from Virginia Tech, and a Juris Doctor from the Claude W. Pettit College of Law at Ohio Northern University.

Career 
Since 2007, Pritt has owned and operated Pritt & Pritt LLC with his wife, Kelly. He was elected to the West Virginia House of Delegates in November 2020 and assumed office on December 1, 2020.

Controversies 
In July 2022, a video of Pritt speaking on the floor of the state legislature showed Pritt arguing against an amendment to a bill allowing men to file pre-term paternity cases against women.

The secondary amendment stated, in part: 
“Any man who purports to be the father of a child, whether born or unborn, may, pursuant to a properly filed and verified petition and parenting plan, seek a court-ordered paternity designation and an allocation of custodial responsibility, child support, decision-making authority, and visitation.  Any petition regarding an unborn child, seeking court-ordered custodial responsibility, child support, decision-making authority, and visitation would take effect once the child is born.”

In response to a portion of his floor speech that was posted on social media, some argued that Pritt was arguing that making men pay child support leads to abortion.

Pritt made the following statement on his Twitter account in response:

“A portion of a floor speech I gave was posted on Twitter. The speech was in response to an amendment allowing men to file pre-birth paternity actions. Never in the speech did I claim men should not have to pay child support.

In fact, I believe parents should be financially responsible for their children. In the speech I described my position that such actions could have the unintended consequence of encouraging abortion.

I’ve personally known of instances where abortions were done after threats of a custody fight, a father going after the mother for child support, or an attack on her character in court.

Unless she is filing herself, in my opinion the last thing a woman needs is unsolicited stress/uncertainty during pregnancy. Like me, one other Republican and most Democrats opposed the amendment. I hope this statement clarifies my position.”

References 

1978 births
Living people
People from Stuart, Virginia
West Virginia Wesleyan College alumni
Virginia Tech alumni
Claude W. Pettit College of Law alumni
Ohio Northern University alumni
West Virginia lawyers
Republican Party members of the West Virginia House of Delegates